Robert Alan Hasegawa (born September 22, 1952) is an American labor leader and politician serving as a member of the Washington State Senate, representing the 11th Legislative District since January 2013. Hasegawa is a lifelong resident of Seattle's Beacon Hill. He previously served in the Washington State House of Representatives, and is retired from the Teamsters Union where he was a member and union leader for over 32 years.

Early life and education
Bob Hasegawa grew up in Seattle, and lives in the Beacon Hill residence he grew up in. The son of Japanese immigrants, his parents, aunts, uncles, and grandparents were interned by the Federal government of the United States during the World War II.

Graduating from Cleveland High School in 1970, Hasegawa studied physics at the University of Washington. He went on to graduate from Antioch University Seattle with dual concentrations in Labor Relations and Organizational and Social Change. Hasegawa also received a Master of Public Administration from the Daniel J. Evans School of Public Policy and Governance at the University of Washington. He holds an Associate degree in Labor Studies from Shoreline Community College and studied information technology at Seattle Central Community College.

Career 
Hasegawa worked as a commercial truck driver, is a certified transport operator, and is a journey-level heavy construction equipment operator. He holds a Class A-Commercial Drivers License, with endorsements for hazardous material, doubles and triple trailer, tank cargo, non-air brake, and pilot car driving. He is also DHS and FAA certified for Seattle–Tacoma International Airport and Boeing Field.

Activism
Hasegawa is a longtime labor and social justice activist from Seattle. He was elected head of the largest Teamsters trucking local workers union in the Pacific Northwest (Teamsters Local 174) for three terms (nine years), and was also a leader in the national Teamsters pro-union democracy reform movement, TDU (Teamsters for a Democratic Union). He was an executive board member of the King County Labor Council, AFL-CIO representing the transportation trades. He was the first Asian American to run for International Vice President of the Teamsters Union, in 2001. On June 30, 2001, "Bob Hasegawa Day" was proclaimed in honor of his labor activism by Seattle Mayor Paul Schell and King County Executive Ron Sims. He received an award that was created in honor of the memory of Silme Domingo and Gene Viernes, labor activists who were killed opposing the regime of Ferdinand Marcos.

Hasegawa serves on the national executive board of the Asian Pacific American Labor Alliance, AFL-CIO (APALA) as well as on the APALA Seattle Chapter Executive Board, and has served on numerous other boards of community-based organizations.

Politics
Hasegawa ran to succeed Representative Velma Veloria in the Washington State House of Representatives in 2004. He defeated a crowded field of Democrats in the primary election, and went on to win the general election with almost two-thirds of the vote.

In early 2012, Hasegawa announced that he was running to succeed Margarita Prentice in the Washington State Senate. Hasegawa eventually won the November 6 election, and took office in January 2013.

Hasegawa announced in 2017 that he would run for mayor of Seattle. He received 8.4% of the vote in the primary election.

Political positions

Housing
Homelessness and housing affordability are big issues in Seattle. Hasegawa has publicly stated his focus on increasing housing, investing in more public housing, and protecting renters. In the Senate, he has supported legislation designed to increase the amount of affordable rental housing. He co-sponsored legislation to increase funding for local homeless housing and assistance programs.

Taxes
Hasegawa has long criticized Washington's tax structure. As a mayoral candidate, he has publicized his opposition to the sweet-beverage tax voted on by the Seattle City Council, calling the tax "regressive." While he voted for the Sound Transit 3 package, Hasegawa has criticized Sound Transit. He has publicly expressed concerns about the effect the increased taxation of ST3 has on low-income residents.

State bank
Hasegawa has long been an advocate for public banking. He has repeatedly introduced legislation to create a state bank in Washington (the "Washington Investment Trust") that would be modeled after the Bank of North Dakota, which is the only current public bank in the United States. Proponents of public banking argue that such banks help stabilize economies, aid long-term growth, and help balance government budgets. He has publicly stated that it would reduce debt servicing costs, generate revenue, and increase the options the state and local jurisdictions have to finance infrastructure projects. A proposal for a municipal bank in Seattle is a component of Hasegawa's mayoral platform.

Affirmative action 
Hasegawa supported Initiative-1000, a measure to re-legalize affirmative action in Washington, in the State Senate.

Electoral history

References

External links
 
 Washington State Legislature - Rep. Bob Hasegawa official WA House website
 BobHasegawa.com Mayoral Campaign Website
 Project Vote Smart - Representative Bob Hasegawa (WA) profile
 Follow the Money – Campaign Contributions and Contributors Bob Hasegawa

1952 births
Living people
American politicians of Japanese descent
Trade unionists from Washington (state)
Democratic Party members of the Washington House of Representatives
Politicians from Seattle
21st-century American politicians
Asian-American people in Washington (state) politics
Evans School of Public Policy and Governance alumni
Democratic Party Washington (state) state senators